Marko Kück (born 14 September 1976) is a German former professional footballer who played as a defender.

Career
In 1999, Kück signed for VfL Osnabrück in the German third division from German Bundesliga side Hamburger SV.

In 2007, he signed for Richmond SC in the Australian second division.

He played in Vietnam for Hanoi-based club Viettel FC.

References

External links
 

Living people
1976 births
Sportspeople from Bremerhaven
German footballers
Association football defenders
Bundesliga players
2. Bundesliga players
Regionalliga players
V.League 1 players
Hamburger SV players
VfL Osnabrück players
SV Wilhelmshaven players
Holstein Kiel players
Rot-Weiss Essen players
Richmond SC players
Viettel FC players
VfL Oldenburg players
German expatriate footballers
German expatriate sportspeople in Vietnam
Expatriate footballers in Vietnam
German expatriate sportspeople in Australia
Expatriate soccer players in Australia
Footballers from Bremen (state)